Master at Arms of the Navy is the most senior Warrant Officer in the South African Navy (SAN). It is a singular appointment – it is only held by one person at any time. The Master at Arms of the Navy holds the rank of Senior Chief Warrant Officer

The Master at Arms of the Navy is responsible to the Chief of the Navy and is a member of his staff as well as the Navy Command Council. The Master is responsible for monitoring and improvement of discipline, morale, well being of sailor and ensuring that the Navy maintains high professional standards.

Rank and Insignia

Rank

Before 2008 all Masters at Arms SA Navy were Warrant Officer Class 1, with appointment to the position of Master at Arms SA Navy.
In 2008 the SANDF expanded the Warrant Officer ranks and the Master at Arms SA Navy now holds the rank of Senior Chief Warrant Officer

Insignia
Prior to 2008 the Master at Arms of the Navy had a unique rank insignia, consisting of a Warrant Officer class 1 insignia with the South African Navy badge above it. 

After the Warrant Officer rank redesign the Master at Arms of the Navy does not have a unique rank insignia

Previous Master at Arms of the Navy

See also
 South African Navy
 South African military ranks

References

Military chiefs
Military ranks of South Africa
South African Navy personnel
Warrant officers